The  Hum Award for Best Television Sensation Female is one of the Hum Awards of Merit presented annually by the Hum Television Network and Entertainment Channel (HTNEC). It is given to an actress who has delivered an outstanding debut performance while working within the television industry. At the 1st Hum Awards (for 2012), award was given to Suhaee Abro for her role in Sanjha.The nominations are solely made by Hum membership.

Since its inception, the award has been given to three actresses, as of 2018 year ceremony, Hania Amir is the most recent winner of this award.

Category

As of 1st ceremony Hum honored a debut Male actor for giving his spectacular performance in drama release in 2012, This category officially termed as Best Television Sensation or unofficially known as Best Debut Female.

List of winners
This category has no nominations since it is given to only one actor, who has delivered outstanding debut performance. However nominations can be made but it is not shown during nomination announcement and winner is only revealed during the ceremony.

2010s

 2013 Suhaee Abro – Sanjha
 2014 Sanam Jung – Dil-e-Muztar
 2015 Hareem Farooq – Mausam
 2016 Iqra Aziz – Mol
 2017 Kubra Khan – Sang-e-Mar Mar
 2018 Hania Amir – Phir Wohi Mohabbat
 2019 Alizeh Shah – Ishq Tamasha

See also 
 Hum Awards
 Hum Awards pre-show
 List of Hum Awards Ceremonies

References

External links
Official websites
 Hum Awards official website
 Hum Television Network and Entertainment Channel (HTNEC)
 Hum's Channel at YouTube (run by the Hum Television Network and Entertainment Channel)
 Hum Awards at Facebook (run by the Hum Television Network and Entertainment Channel)]

Hum Awards
Hum Award winners
Hum TV
Hum Network Limited